The New Brunswick Federation of Labour is the New Brunswick provincial trade union federation of the Canadian Labour Congress. In 2019 it reported a membership of more than 35,000.

History 
The New Brunswick Federation of Labour was organized at a meeting of union delegates in Saint John on 16 September 1913, making it the third provincial federation of labour to be established in Canada, after British Columbia and Alberta. James L. Sugrue of Saint John was elected as president. In early 1914 the Federation obtained a charter from the Trades and Labour Congress of Canada. In 1956 delegates voted to join its successor, the Canadian Labour Congress.

The Federation of Labour's first major achievement was a provincial Workmen's Compensation Act (1918), which was based on insurance principles and administered by a board with labour representation. The Federation has a long record of support for social reforms that protect the rights of union members and promote the interests of the province's working class.

The NBFL is composed of unionized workers within the province, having representatives attending its conventions from almost every community in New Brunswick where a labour organization exists. In addition to its growth in size and influence since its beginnings, the Federation has benefited from greater diversity in membership, especially the participation of francophones, women and public sector workers.

The NBFL is now Labour's central voice in New Brunswick. Although the Federation does not directly bargain on behalf of union members, it encourages workers to join to ensure fair and safe workplaces and to build solidarity and mutual support among workers.

Executive Officers

External links 
 http://fednb.ca/ official site.
https://archives.gnb.ca/lhtnb/Welcome_en-CA.aspx Labour History in New Brunswick

References 

Canadian Labour Congress
Provincial federations of labour (Canada)
Moncton